Ouarzazate Airport  is an airport serving Ouarzazate, a city in the Drâa-Tafilalet region in Morocco. The airport served 52,791 passengers in 2016.

Facilities
Aircraft parking space of  supports up to three Boeing 747s.

The paved runway is laid out in the direction 12/30 and measures . It can receive all modern jetliners up to the Boeing 747 in size. The airport is equipped with an ILS Cat II landing system and offers the following radio navigation aids: DME.

Airlines and destinations
The following airlines operate regular scheduled and charter flights at Ouarzazate Airport:

References

External links
 Ouarzazate page at ONDA website
 
 

Airports in Morocco
Buildings and structures in Drâa-Tafilalet